Captain Dudley Henry Forbes (13 January 1873 – 21 April 1901) played first-class cricket for Oxford University and the Marylebone Cricket Club (MCC). Born in Ireland and educated in England, he was an officer of the British Army during the Second Boer War, but died during the conflict.

Forbes was born at Forenaughts House, near Naas, County Kildare, Ireland. Sent to England to be educated, he attended Eton College before going on to Christ Church, Oxford. Forbes made his first-class debut for Oxford University in 1894, in a 12-per-side match against A. J. Webbe's XI. A right-arm fast bowler, he took 6/86 in his opponent's only innings, which were to be the best bowling figures of his first-class career. Later in 1894, Forbes also took 5/21 against an MCC team, and played in the annual University Match against Cambridge University. He played only twice for Oxford during the 1895 season (against Somerset and the MCC), and after that did not return to first-class level until the 1898 season, when he represented the MCC against Oxford. Forbes' final first-class appearance came in June 1899, for an "Oxford University Past and Present" team against the touring Australians. He took 6/100 opening the bowling with Foster Cunliffe, dismissing the noted batsmen Joe Darling, Jack Worrall, and Victor Trumper.

A captain in the 3rd (Militia) Battalion Royal Scots, Forbes briefly played club cricket for the West of Scotland Cricket Club, and in May 1899 represented Scotland in a three-day match against Lancashire. In March 1900, his battalion was sent to South Africa to fight in the Second Boer War. Forbes saw service in both the Cape Colony and the Orange River Colony, including a brief period as commandant at Roodeval Spruit. He died of enteric fever in April 1901, at Kroonstad. Forbes's brother-in-law, Alan Hotham, also played first-class cricket, making a single appearance for Hampshire in 1901.

See also
 List of cricketers who were killed during military service
 Dubhaltach Mac Fhirbhisigh, historian, anglicised as 'Dudley Forbes'

References

External links
 Player profile and statistics at CricketArchive
 Player profile and statistics at ESPNcricinfo

1873 births
1901 deaths
19th-century Irish people
20th-century Irish people
Alumni of Christ Church, Oxford
British Army personnel of the Second Boer War
British military personnel killed in the Second Boer War
Deaths from typhoid fever
English cricketers
Irish cricketers
Marylebone Cricket Club cricketers
Oxford University cricketers
People educated at Eton College
People from Naas
Royal Scots officers
Oxford University Past and Present cricketers
Military personnel from County Kildare